The Petroglyphs of Arpa-Uzen can be found in the Karatau mountain range of southern Kazakhstan.

Site description
The petroglyphs of Arpa-Uzen, located on ancient migration routes, include over 3500 examples of rock art, the most abundant collection in all of southern Kazakhstan.  These pictorials depict scenes from life during the Late Bronze Age to Early Iron Age, portraying the domestication and sacrifice of animals amongst other things.  A palimpsest was formed where in older petroglyphs were covered by Saka pictorials from the Middle Ages.

World Heritage Status
This site was added to the UNESCO World Heritage Tentative List on September 24, 1998 in the Cultural category.
(see List of World Heritage Sites in Kazakhstan)

See also
Rock Art

Notes

References
Petroglyphs of Arpa-Uzen - UNESCO World Heritage Centre Retrieved 2009-03-02.

Archaeological sites in Kazakhstan
Kazakhstani culture
Rock art in Asia
World Heritage Tentative List